The black fantail (Rhipidura atra) is a species of bird in the family Rhipiduridae.
It is found in the highlands of New Guinea.
Its natural habitat is subtropical or tropical moist montane forests.

References

black fantail
Birds of New Guinea
black fantail
Taxonomy articles created by Polbot